is a Japanese table tennis player. Her younger brother Masataka Morizono is also a table tennis player.

Achievements

ITTF Tours
Women's singles

Women's doubles

References

1992 births
Japanese female table tennis players
Living people
Sportspeople from Tokyo
People from Nishitōkyō, Tokyo
Table tennis players at the 2018 Asian Games
Asian Games competitors for Japan